Mehri Vadadian (–) was an Iranian actress, known for her roles in numerous films and TV dramas. Among her films such as Shazdeh Ehtejab (dir. Bahman Farmanara), Downpour (dir. Bahram Beizai), The Morning of the Fourth Day (dir. Kamran Shirdel) and Delshodegan (dir. Ali Hatami). She died in Sajjad Hospital in Tehran in 2011.

References

1936 births
2011 deaths
People from Tehran
Actresses from Tehran
Iranian film actresses
Iranian stage actresses
Iranian television actresses